Wildcat Field is a baseball field on the campus of Clear Creek High School, in League City, Texas. Named after the schools mascot the "Wildcats." It is located adjacent to the Clear Creek Independent School District Stadium.  It is the home of the Clear Creek High School Wildcats baseball team and was home to the Bay Area Toros of the Continental Baseball League in 2007.

External links
 Official site of the Creek High School Wildcats baseball team

Minor league baseball venues
Baseball venues in Texas